Michael John Hedges MS (born 8 July 1956) is a Welsh Labour politician, who been the Member of the Senedd (MS) for the constituency of Swansea East since the 2011 Senedd election.

Personal life
Hedges has lived in Morriston for many years but was born in the Plasmarl area of Swansea. He is married to Anne and has a daughter, Catrin, who attends Ysgol Gyfun Bryntawe.

He attended Plasmarl, Parklands and Penlan Schools, and went on to higher education at Swansea University and Cardiff University.

Active in local sport, Hedges has been a football referee and coach, and was secretary of Morriston town for several years. Hedges is president of Ynystawe Cricket and Football Club and is a social member of both Morriston RFC and Glais RFC.

Professional background
Originally a research scientist for British Steel Corporation at Port Talbot, Hedges has spent the last 27 years as a senior lecturer in Pontypridd, specialising in computing and information technology.

Political history
Hedges was elected to represent Morriston on the City and County of Swansea Council in 1995. He was re-elected in 1999, 2004 and 2008.  He was previously a member of West Glamorgan County Council  from 1989. He  held a number of senior posts on the Council, including Council Leader and Cabinet Member for Finance & Technical Services. He was also Vice-Chair of the Council's Scrutiny Committee and the Welsh Local Government Association spokesperson on both social services and information.
 
Taking an active interest in education, Hedges has been a governor of Swansea University, Swansea Institute, Mynyddbach and Morriston Comprehensives, Swansea College. He is currently chair of the governors of Glyncollen Primary School and Ynystawe Primary School.
 
Hedges was a non-executive director of Swansea NHS Trust between 1999 and 2005. His political interests include education, health, local government, sports provision and social deprivation.

Committee membership and cross party group membership

Hedges currently sits as a member on the Senedd's Finance Committee, Public Accounts Committee and Health and Social Care Committee. He is also Chair of the Cross Party Group on Older People & Ageing as well as a member of the Cross Party Groups on Autism, Beer & The Pub, Co-operatives & Mutuals, Cancer, Deaf Issues and PCS Union.

References

1956 births
Living people
Welsh Labour members of the Senedd
Wales AMs 2011–2016
Wales MSs 2021–2026
Welsh Labour councillors
Leaders of local authorities of Wales